The Stăneasa (also: Stăneasca) is a left tributary of the river Olt in Romania. It flows into the Olt near Olanu.

References

Rivers of Romania
Rivers of Vâlcea County